Wild Things Run Fast is the 11th studio album by Canadian singer-songwriter Joni Mitchell. Her first of four releases for Geffen Records, it was released in 1982 and represents her departure from jazz to a more 1980s pop sound. This was her first album to work with bassist Larry Klein, whom she married in 1982. Klein would play bass on and co-produce her next four albums.

The resulting world tour took Mitchell through the U.S., Europe, Asia and Australia. A video of the tour was released in 1983, entitled Refuge of the Roads. The recorded performances were not performed in front of a live audience, but rather recorded live in a studio once the tour had been completed, with applause dubbed-in during post-production. There was also some Super 8 footage taken by Mitchell on the road. It has since been released on DVD.

Mitchell claimed that her inspiration for the album came from hearing the music of popular bands such as Steely Dan, Talking Heads and The Police at a discothèque during a trip to the Caribbean in 1981. She said that hearing The Police, especially, affected her sound, saying, "their rhythmic hybrids, and the positioning of the drums, and the sound of the drums, was one of the main calls out to me to make a more rhythmic album".

Track listing

Personnel 
Track numbering refers to CD and digital releases of the album.
 Joni Mitchell – vocals, acoustic guitar , electric guitar on  piano , electric piano , cover painting
 Larry Klein – bass, rhythmic arrangements 
 Michael Landau – electric guitar 
 Steve Lukather – electric guitar 
 John Guerin – drums , whisper chorus 
 Vinnie Colaiuta – drums , rhythmic arrangements 
 Don Alias – rhythmic arrangements 
 Russell Ferrante – Oberheim synthesizer 
 Wayne Shorter – soprano saxophone 
 Larry Carlton – guitar 
 Victor Feldman – percussion 
 Kim Hutchcroft – baritone saxophone 
 Lionel Richie – backing vocals , co-lead vocals 
 Charles Valentino – backing vocals 
 Howard Kinney – backing vocals 
 James Taylor – backing vocals 
 Kenny Rankin – whisper chorus 
 Robert De La Garza – whisper chorus 
 Skip Cottrell – whisper chorus

Technical personnel 
Joni Mitchell – production, mixing
Larry Klein – mixing
Henry Lewy – engineering at A&M
Skip Cottrell – engineering at A&M
Clyde Kaplan – assistant engineering at A&M
Jerry Hudgins – engineering at Devonshire Sound
Larry Hirsch – mixing
Chase Williams – assistant mixing
John Golden – vinyl mastering
Lee Herschberg – CD remastering

Charts

References 

1982 albums
Joni Mitchell albums
Geffen Records albums
Albums recorded at A&M Studios
Albums produced by Joni Mitchell
Albums with cover art by Joni Mitchell